Johann Friedrich Doles (23 April 1715 – 8 February 1797) was a German composer and pupil of Johann Sebastian Bach.

Doles was born in Steinbach-Hallenberg.  He attended the University of Leipzig. He was Kantor at the Leipzig Thomasschule, conducting the Thomanerchor from 1756 to 1789; in that year (1789) he directed the performance of Bach's motet Singet dem Herrn ein neues Lied that reportedly made a deep impression on Mozart. Doles wrote a manuscript treatise on singing which may preserve some elements of Bach's own methods.

References
Oxford Composer Companions, J.S. Bach (1999), p. 140

External links

 

1715 births
1797 deaths
People from Steinbach-Hallenberg
German Classical-period composers
German male classical composers
Leipzig University alumni
Thomaskantors
18th-century classical composers
18th-century conductors (music)
18th-century German composers
18th-century German male musicians